The following is a list of notable events and releases of the year 1908 in Norwegian music.

Events

Deaths

Births

 June
 30 – Paul Okkenhaug, composer and organist (died 1975).

 August
 31 – Conrad Baden, organist, composer, music educator, and music critic (died 1989).

 October
 19 – Geirr Tveitt, composer and pianist (died 1981).

See also
 1908 in Norway
 Music of Norway

References

 
Norwegian music
Norwegian
Music
1900s in Norwegian music